The  award is a civil medal awarded in the Basque Country, Spain. It is awarded by the Basque Government to Basques "who have extraordinarily distinguished themselves due to their dedication, constancy, and innovative spirit in their field of work". It is the second highest distinction awarded by the Basque Government.

Recipients
The following people have been awarded the medal:

 Juan Arregui Garay (1997)
 José María Ormaetxea (1997)
 José Ángel Sánchez Asiaín (1997)
  (1997)
 Telmo Zarra (1997)

  (2000)
 Juan Celaya Letamendi (2000)
 Eduardo Chillida (2000)
 Jorge Oteiza (2000)
 Micaela Portilla (2000)

  (2002)
 Ainhoa Arteta (2002)
 Juan Mari Arzak (2002)
 Martín Ugalde (2002)
 Gaspar Vicinay (2002)

  (2005)
 Ángel Iglesias (2005)

 José María Aldekoa (2009)
  (2009)
 Iñaki Gabilondo (2009)
 Edurne Pasaban (2009)

 Xabi Alonso (2010)
 Imanol Arias (2010)
 María Luisa Laka (2010)
 Manu Leguineche (2010)
 Patty Miller (2010)
 Javier Ormazabal (2010)

 Eduardo Anitua (2011)
 Juan Ángel Balbás (2011)
 Ana Blanco (2011)
 Martín Fiz (2011)
 Juan Pablo Fusi (2011)
  (2011)

 Nely Carla Alberto (2012)
 Maialen Chourraut (2012)
 Patricia Elorza (2012)
 José Luis Novoa (2012)
 Richard Oribe (2012)
 Elisabeth Pinedo (2012)
 Ramiro Pinilla (2012)
 Ramon Saizarbitoria (2012)
 Maider Unda (2012)

References

Orders, decorations, and medals of the Basque Country (autonomous community)
1996 establishments in the Basque Country (autonomous community)
Awards established in 1996